Dmitry Viktorovich Livanov (born February 15, 1967, in Moscow) is a Russian Doctor of Physics, professor, former rector of Moscow Institute of Steel and Alloys, and  the Minister of Education and Science of the Russian Federation (2012-2016).

In 1990, he graduated with honors from the Physical Chemistry Department of the Moscow Institute of Steel and Alloys. In 1990-1992, he studied at the postgraduate in same institute, where he defended his thesis for the degree of Candidate of Physico-Mathematical Sciences on "Heat transfer interacting electrons in superconductors and normal metals". In 1992-2000, he worked in that institute as Research fellow and senior researcher, Laboratory synthesis, Associate Professor at the Department of Theoretical Physics.

In 2004-2005, he became director of the scientific-technical and innovation department of the Ministry of Education and Science. In 2005-2007, he was promoted to Deputy Minister of Education and Science. In 2007, he became rector of the Moscow Institute of Steel and Alloys and additional President of the Black Sea Universities Network. He held this position till 21 May 2012, when he was appointed to the Minister of Education and Science of the Russian Federation in Dmitry Medvedev's Cabinet.

In 2013 he signed the reform tha tincorporated the Russian Academy of Medical Sciences and the Russian Academy of Agriculture Sciences into the Russian Academy of Sciences (RAS), subordinating it to the Federal Agency of Scientific Organizations (FASO), a government-controlled entity which realized a takeover of the RAS assets.

On 19 August 2016 was replaced in the government with Olga Yurievna Vasilyeva and appointed special representative of the president on trade and economic relations with Ukraine. On 26 August 2016 the Ukrainian Ministry of Economic Development and Trade reported that it did not have had any contact with Livanov.

References

1967 births
United Russia politicians
21st-century Russian politicians
Living people
Education ministers of Russia
National University of Science and Technology MISiS alumni
Russian Freemasons
Kutafin Moscow State Law University alumni